RC Říčany is a Czech rugby club based in Říčany. They currently play in the KB Extraliga. Since 2009 they also compete in the Central & Eastern European Rugby Cup along with fellow Czechs Dragon Brno.

History
RC Říčany was founded in 1944 by Josef Kohout, after which the club's home ground is named.

The club had a tough start, as World War II was still pretty much in full force. People were living in fear for the Gestapo or being sent to work in Germany. 

Initially, they played only friendly matches, including a match against an Anglo-American forces side in 1946. 

1952 saw the temporary cessation of rugby activity, owing to the lack of skilled players and competent officials, problems with the playing field and financial struggles.

In 1956 the club restarted again, with more focus on developing home-grown players, and with Josef Kohout still a major driving force behind the club.

The club celebrated their 65th anniversary in 2009.

Historical names 
 DTJ Říčany (1944)
 Meteor Říčany (1946–49)
 TJ Sokol Říčany (1950–66)
 TJ Sokol Disk Říčany (1967–87)
 TJ Sokol Spoje Říčany (1988–89)
 Rugby Club Říčany (1990-2010)
 Rugby Club Mountfield Říčany (2011-)

Honours
 KB Extraliga
 1996, 2001, 2004, 2005, 2006, 2011, 2012, 2021

Notable former players

  Josef Kohout
  Martin Cimprich

References

External links
 RC Říčany 
 80 years of Czech Rugby

Czech rugby union teams
Rugby clubs established in 1944
Prague-East District